The Stanhope may refer to:
Stanhope Hotel
Stanhope essay prize